The California Museum is the state history museum of California, located in its capital city of Sacramento and housed within the Secretary of State building complex. It is home to the California Hall of Fame.

Associations 
The California Museum is a member of the American Alliance of Museums, California Association of Museums and Sacramento Association of Museums. It is Sacramento's only museum to win the American Alliance of Museum’s Excellence in Exhibition Award (2013).

References

External links 
 Official website

Museums in Sacramento, California
Art museums and galleries in California
History museums in California
Women's museums in California
Museums established in 1998
1998 establishments in California